Ramsey is an unincorporated community in Jackson Township, Harrison County, in the U.S. state of Indiana.

It is the location of North Harrison High School.

History
Platted on March 14, 1883, Ramsey was originally known as Jackson City. It was laid out by Howard Ramsey alongside the Louisville, Evansville and St. Louis Railroad (now known as Norfolk Southern Railway).

The Ramsey post office was established in 1884.

Geography

References

Unincorporated communities in Harrison County, Indiana
Unincorporated communities in Indiana
Louisville metropolitan area
Populated places established in 1883
1883 establishments in Indiana